BibleProject (also known as The Bible Project) is a non-profit, crowdfunded organization based in Portland, Oregon, focused on creating free educational resources to help people understand the Bible. The organization was founded in 2014 by Tim Mackie and Jon Collins.

BibleProject produces animated videos that explore the literary structure, themes, and history of individual books of the Bible, as well as videos that explore key biblical concepts and themes. These videos are available on their website, YouTube, and various social media platforms. The organization also produces podcasts, study guides, online classes, a mobile app, and other resources. Resources are available for free to users of the website and application.

History 
BibleProject was started by two friends Tim Mackie and Jon Collins in 2014. They wanted to create free online teaching videos combining Mackie's academic background with Collins' professional experience writing explainer videos for technology companies. By 2019 BibleProject had created over 130 videos and 200 podcasts The organization's model is to be crowdfunded. Revenue increased from less than $900,000 in 2015 to over $9 million in 2019. As of 2022, BibleProject videos have been viewed across various social media platforms over 100 million times. In 2022, the organization launched a new mobile app.

References

External links
 

Organizations established in 2014
Bible societies